Killing Jesus is an American television film inspired by the 2013 book of the same title by Bill O'Reilly and Martin Dugard. This is National Geographic's third installment of television adaptations of O'Reilly's non-fiction books which included Killing Lincoln and Killing Kennedy. The cast includes Haaz Sleiman, Kelsey Grammer, Stephen Moyer, Emmanuelle Chriqui, and John Rhys-Davies.

It debuted on the National Geographic Channel on March 29, 2015.

Premise
The film chronicles the life of Jesus of Nazareth through the retelling of the political, social, and historical conflicts during the Roman Empire that ultimately led to his crucifixion.

Cast
 Haaz Sleiman as Jesus
 Alexis Rodney as Peter
 Joe Doyle as Judas Iscariot
 Aneurin Barnard as James
 Abhin Galeya as John the Baptist
 Rufus Sewell as Caiaphas
 John Lynch as Nicodemus
 John Rhys-Davies as Annas
 Stephen Moyer as Pontius Pilate
 Tamsin Egerton as Claudia
 Kelsey Grammer as Herod the Great
 Eoin Macken as Herod Antipas
 Emmanuelle Chriqui as Herodias
 Stephanie Leonidas as Salome
 Vernon Dobtcheff as Isaiah
 Klára Issová as Mary Magdalene
 Mehdi Pyro as Andrew

Development
In March 2014, it was announced Killing Jesus was being adapted into a four-hour miniseries, and Walon Green has been tapped to write and executive produce the project. Also returning as executive producers are Ridley Scott, David W. Zucker, and Mary Lisio, who previously produced Killing Kennedy. In August 2014, Christopher Menaul was attached to direct the miniseries.

Reception
The review aggregation website Rotten Tomatoes gave the series a 43% approval rating based on 7 reviews, with an average rating of 5.70/10.

Viewership
On its premiere airing, the film was watched by 3.7 million viewers, averaging a 1.0 rating among adults in the 25-54 demographic. The viewership surpassed the record previously held by Killing Kennedy.

Accolades

References

External links
 

2015 television films
2015 films
American biographical films
Films about Christianity
Films based on non-fiction books
Films set in Israel
Films set in Jerusalem
Films set in the Roman Empire
2015 drama films
National Geographic (American TV channel) original programming
Films about Jesus
Film portrayals of Jesus' death and resurrection
Portrayals of the Virgin Mary in film
Films based on works by Bill O'Reilly (political commentator)
Films based on works by Martin Dugard (author)
Cultural depictions of John the Baptist
Cultural depictions of Pontius Pilate
Portrayals of Mary Magdalene in film
Films directed by Christopher Menaul
2010s American films
American drama television films